Jams or JAMS may refer to:

Plural form of jam, a type of fruit preserve
Jams (clothing line)
JAMS (organization), United States organization that provides alternative dispute resolution services
The JAMs, former name of The KLF, a British band
The Jams, a waterfall along Cache Creek in Lake County, California
Jams (album), 1995 album by Northeast Groovers

Acronym
Journal of African Media Studies
Journal of the Academy of Marketing Science
Journal of the American Mathematical Society
Journal of the American Musicological Society
JAMS (organization), an alternative dispute resolution service 
John Adams Middle School, one of the Edison Township Public Schools in Edison, New Jersey, US

See also
Jam (disambiguation)